de Carli is a surname. Notable people with the surname include:

Adelir Antônio de Carli (1966 – 2008), Brazilian Catholic priest
Giampiero de Carli (born 1970), Italian rugby union player and coach

See also

De Carle
De Carlo
Marco di Carli